John Munson (born December 13, 1966) is an American musician who is best known as the bass player for Semisonic. He was also a member of Trip Shakespeare during the late 1980s and early 1990s.

Trip Shakespeare
Matt Wilson, lead vocalist of Trip Shakespeare, recalled how Munson joined that band in 1985:

Semisonic
When Trip Shakespeare dissolved, Munson and fellow band member Dan Wilson—Matt's brother—formed a new band called Pleasure with Jacob Slichter, which later became Semisonic.

Current projects
Currently Munson is working on several different projects, including working with former Trip Shakespeare mate Matt Wilson on new songs as The Flops and later The Twilight Hours, and also on the New Standards, a band that plays covers of a wide variety of music in a jazz format. Other members of the New Standards include Chan Poling (formerly of Minneapolis dance pop band The Suburbs) and Steve Roehm. Munson teaches Sound For Image class at MCTC college in Minneapolis, Minnesota. Munson has also provided music and commentary for the program "Wits" on Minnesota Public Radio. While performing on Wits, Munson's back-up band was called the Witnesses and its members were as follows: Janey Winterbauer on vocals, Steve Roehm on vibes, Richard Medek on drums, and Joe Savage on pedal steel.

References

1966 births
Living people
Musicians from Minneapolis
Guitarists from Minnesota
American male bass guitarists
Semisonic members
Trip Shakespeare members
20th-century American bass guitarists
20th-century American male musicians